Colonel Bounleuth Saycocie (1 September 1931 - 23 October 2014) was a Lao military and political figure of the Second Indochina War.

Biography
Bounleut Saycocie was born in Hineboune District, Khammouan Province and attended the Lycée Pavie in Vientiane followed by the Lao Military Academy (Army Officers School) at Dong Hene, Savannakhet Province. He also studied at the French Army Staff College (Ecole d'Etat-Major) in Paris and at the U.S. Army Command and General Staff College in Fort Leavenworth, Kansas.

From 1960 to 1962 he was a lieutenant colonel and served as Military Attaché to the Royal Lao Embassy in Washington D.C. He was promoted to colonel in 1962 and served as Chief of Special Cabinet (Military Affairs) of the Ministry of Defense until 1964.  From 1964 to 1966, he was Chief Logistics Officer of the Royal Lao Army in Vientiane.

Bounleut attempted a coup on 31 January 1965. Phoumi Nosavan attempted his own coup at the same time. Both coups were crushed by Kouprasith Abhay by 3 February. Undaunted by his failure, Bounleut conspired with General Thao Ma to prepare for the 1966 Laotian coup. After the coup failed, Bounleut took refuge in Thailand where he remained until 1968, when he moved to France.

Along with Phoumi, he is said to have assisted in drafting the plan for Thao Ma's attempted coup in August 1973. Bounleut accompanied Thao Ma in the latter's seizure of Wattay International Airport on 20 August 1973. While Thao Ma commandeered aircraft, Bounleut drove an armored car into Vientiane to take over the radio station. At 07:00 hours, he broadcast a communiqué calling for the replacement of Prince Souvanna Phouma by Prince Boun Oum. As the coup was suppressed, Bounleut stole a Cessna U-17 and returned to Thailand.

After the Lao People's Democratic Republic was established by the communist Pathet Lao in 1975, Col. Bounleuth became a leader of the anti-communist political and military resistance against the communist Lao government and their Vietnamese mentors.

Col. Bounleuth finally immigrated to the US in 2000 as a political refugee. He had a stroke a few years later and is paralyzed and bed ridden. He lives in Minneapolis, Minnesota.. He died on 23 October 2014 at the age of 83.

See also
 1965 Laotian coups
 1966 Laotian coup
 1973 Laotian coup
Brigadier-General Thao Ty
Brigadier-General Thao Ma
General Ouane Rattikone
General Phoumi Nosavan
Major-General Vang Pao
Royal Lao Armed Forces
Laotian Civil War

Notes

References 
 Anthony, Victor B. and Richard R. Sexton (1993). The War in Northern Laos. Command for Air Force History. OCLC 232549943.
 Conboy, Kenneth and James Morrison (1995), Shadow War: The CIA's Secret War in Laos. Paladin Press. .

1931 births
2014 deaths
Laotian military leaders
Military personnel of the Vietnam War
Laotian anti-communists
People of the Laotian Civil War